Parithimar Kalaignar (born V. G. Suryanarayana Sastri at Vilacheri near Thirupparankundram on 6 July 1870 – 2 November 1903), a Professor of Tamil at the Madras Christian College,  was the first person to campaign for the recognition of Tamil as a classical language.

Life 

Suryanarayana Sastri was born at Vilacheri near Thirupparankundram in a Brahmin family. He graduated in philosophy and was soon employed as a Professor of Tamil in the Madras Christian College. In 1895, Suryanarayana Sastri rose to become the Head of Department for Tamil at the Madras Christian College.

Campaign for recognition of Tamil as classical language 

Suryanarayana Sastri had immense love for Tamil and wrote plenty of books. He even changed his Sanskrit name to its Tamil translation (although "Parithi"  பரிதி and "Kalai"  கலை are from Sanskrit परिधि and कला, respectively).

When the Madras University proposed to exclude Tamil from its syllabus, Parithimar Kalaignar vehemently protested against the proposal forcing the authorities to drop the move. In 1902, he proposed that Tamil be designated as a "classical language" thereby becoming the first person to make such a petition. Parithimar Kalignar is also known as Dravida Sastri.

Parithimar Kalaignar was also the first to use the Tamil name Kumarinadu for the mythical lost-land of Lemuria.

Death 

Paritihimar Kalaignar died in 1903 due to tuberculosis at the age of 33.

Legacy 

Parithimar Kalaignar is regarded as an inspiration for Tamil enthusiasts as Maraimalai Adigal and the Tanittamil Iyakkam.

In 2006, the Government of Tamil Nadu declared Parithimar Kalaignar's house in his native village of Vilacheri as a memorial and sanctioned a sum of  towards nationalizing his books.

On 17 August 2007, postage stamps were issued in memory of Saint Vallalar, Parithimar Kalaignar and Maraimalai Adigal.

See also 

 Tanittamil Iyakkam

References

External links

 

1870 births
1903 deaths
Tamil-language writers
Tamil language activists
Tamil writers
People from Madurai district